Joseph R. Kruse (September 9, 1914 – January 18, 2003) was an American professional basketball and football player. He played for the Cincinnati Comellos in the National Basketball League during the 1937–38 season and averaged 3.3 points per game.

Kruse also played in the American Football League for the Cincinnati Bengals from 1937 through 1941. In he was named to the All-AFL Team in the 1941 season.

References

1914 births
2003 deaths
United States Army personnel of World War II
American men's basketball players
Basketball players from Louisville, Kentucky
Cincinnati Bengals (AFL III) players
Cincinnati Comellos players
Guards (basketball)
Players of American football from Louisville, Kentucky
Xavier Musketeers football players
Xavier Musketeers men's basketball players